Latvian Australians are Australian citizens of Latvian descent, or persons born in Latvia who reside in Australia. At the 2016 Census, 20,509 residents in Australia reported to have Latvian ancestry.

Few Latvians arrived in Australia before 1947.

Between 1947 and 1952, 19,700 Latvian refugees arrived in Australia as displaced persons under the supervision of the International Refugee Organisation. The first voyage under Arthur Calwell's Displaced Persons immigration program, that of the General Stuart Heintzelman in 1947, was specially chosen to be all from Baltic nations, all single, many blond and blue-eyed, in order to appeal to the Australian public. Of the 843 immigrants on the Heintzelman, 264 were Latvian.

Sport

Soccer
In 1955, the Melbourne Latvian community established its own Association football (soccer) club that competed in the modern-day Football Victoria state-league system, later folding at the conclusion of the 1959 league season. The club was founded as 'Brunswick' (later renamed as 'Brunswick Latvia'), being named after the relevant inner-northern suburb where many European immigrants settled in Melbourne following the second world war. The club were premiers of the 'Victoria Metropolitan League South', being the southern conference of the modern day Victorian State League 1, which was the fourth state league tier at the time which was achieved in its inaugural season of 1955. The club's highest ladder achievement in its highest level of competition was in 1958 where the club finished eighth in the 'Victorian Metropolitan League Division One North', being the northern conference of the modern-day National Premier Leagues Victoria 2, being the state's second division at the time. The club's last season was the following season in 1959, and throughout its existence all of the club's home matches were played on the soccer ovals of Royal Park in the neighboring suburb of Parkville.

Notable Latvian Australians

 Theodore Boronovskis, Australian Latvian judoka
 Peter Dombrovskis, Australian Latvian photographer
 Peter Greste, Australian Latvian journalist
 Konrāds Kalējs, Australian Latvian alleged war criminal
 Ilsa Konrads, Australian Latvian Olympic swimmer
 John Konrads, Australian Latvian Olympic swimmer
 Andrej Lemanis, Latvian Australian basketball coach and former player
 John Spalvins, Australian businessman and former manager of the Adelaide Steamship Company
 Imants Tillers, Australian Latvian painter
 Nadine Wulffius, Australian Latvian ballet dancer
Feliks Zemdegs, Australian speedcuber
 Andrew Zesers, Australian World Cup-winning cricketer

See also 
 Latvian diaspora

References

External links
  [CC-By-SA] (Latvians in Sydney)
 Sydney Latvian Society
 Melbourne Latvian House

European Australian
Latvian diaspora
Main